Parliamentary elections were held in Mali on 12 June 1964. Voters were presented with a single list from the Sudanese Union – African Democratic Rally (US-RDA), which had been the sole legal party since shortly after independence in 1960. As a result, it won all 80 seats in the National Assembly.  According to official results, 99 percent of those who voted approved the US-RDA list.

Results

References

Mali
1964 in Mali
Elections in Mali
One-party elections